The Auckland Central Business District (CBD), or Auckland city centre, is the geographical and economic heart of the Auckland metropolitan area. It is the area in which Auckland was established in 1840, by William Hobson. It is New Zealand's leading financial hub, and the centre of the country's economy; the GDP of the Auckland Region was $126.917 billion in the year ending March 2022.

The CBD is one of the most densely developed places in New Zealand, with many commercial and some residential developments packed into a space of only . The area is made up of the city's largest concentration of skyscrapers and businesses. Bounded by several major motorways and by the harbour coastline in the north, it is surrounded further out by mostly suburban areas; it is bounded on the North by Waitematā Harbour, east by Parnell, southeast by Grafton, south by Mount Eden, southwest by Newton, west by Freemans Bay and northwest by Viaduct Harbour.

Geography

Located on the northern shore of a narrow isthmus, the CBD extends from the Auckland waterfront on the Waitematā Harbour southwards along Queen Street and a number of other parallel-running streets. The CBD is generally considered to be bounded by the main motorways that surround all non-harbour sides, with State Highway 1 forming the southern and western boundaries, and State Highway 16 / Grafton Gully forming the eastern boundary.

The CBD is to a substantial part located on reclaimed land of the Waitematā Harbour. For a closer discussion of this aspect, see the Commercial Bay and Auckland waterfront articles.

History

The town of Auckland was created in 1840 with the first European colonisation of the area, marked by an official ceremony on the now non-existent Point Britomart. The initial centre of the new town was focused on what is now the corner of Shortland and Queen Streets, which was at the shoreline of Commercial Bay. From approximately their junction, the main wharf ran north off the end of Queen Street, with Shortland Street leading up to Fort Britomart and Government House, around which many of the richer people built houses. Shortland Street tended to be the location of the more important businesses and most of the 'luxury' shops of the mid 19th century. The 1850s onwards saw an increasing number of businesses, and especially retail, locating further south along Queen Street, which still to this day forms the 'spine' of the area.

In 1841, one year after the European founding, the census counted approximately 2,000 people, with "mechanics" the largest group at 250, and other groups of note being 150 agricultural labourers, 100 shopkeepers, 100 domestic servants, and 125 "upper class members".

During the remainder of the 19th century, Commercial Bay was progressively filled in, allowing a northward extension of Queen Street and the creation of Fort Street, Customs Street, and Quay Street. The part of Queen Street north of Customs Street is today referred to informally as Lower Queen Street.

As well as being the location of a great many multi-storey warehouses, initially the Lower Queen Street area also contained many manufacturing businesses, though many of these started to move to other areas such as Freeman's Bay, Newton and Parnell, especially if they took up a large area (such as timber yards) or created noise or pollution (such as brick yards or foundries). Up until the middle of the 20th century the centre of town still contained a large number of small factories including clothing manufacturers.

The relocation of industries to outlying suburbs became especially pronounced in the 1950s, partly due to incentives made by council planners to create industrial areas in Penrose and Rosebank Road (amongst others) and thus rid the inner city area of noise, pollution and heavy traffic. This was mirrored by the development of suburban shopping malls (the first being LynnMall in 1963) which enticed retailers to vacate the inner city as well. Attempts by the council to halt this pattern by constructing numerous public car parking buildings met with varying success. The rise of suburban supermarket and mall shopping that was created in places such as Pakuranga from 1965 onwards has been added to by the appearance of Big Box retailers in places such as Botany and the North Shore.

Residential numbers in the inner city (including the inner suburbs) were also declining in the 20th century from as early as the 1920s. In the two-mile zone surrounding the CBD, there were approximately 70,000 people in 1926, with only around 50,000 in 1966 – a change made even more marked by the development of the remainder of Auckland's population, which grew more than fourfold in the same timeframe. In the 1990s, only a token population of around 1,400 was still residing within the CBD, though this was to grow substantially with a boom of new apartment buildings around the turn of the millennium. More recently, in the early 21st century the CBD has seen a resurgence with strong population growth.  there were around 24,000 apartment units.  the CBD is growing at six times the rate of the overall region.

Characteristics

Overview

The CBD of Auckland has been the leading centre of New Zealand's business and economic development for nearly two centuries. The area of today's CBD was the site of the original European settlement of Auckland, oriented along the coastline and then Queen Street, in a southward direction. From those origins, it has grown progressively, and become much more densely built-up, now being an area of high-rise buildings mainly used for commercial and retail uses. It has the highest concentration of arts, culture and higher education institutions and venues in the country.

Some commentators have noted that the recent decades have not been kind to the aesthetics and the community values of the inner city. The demolishing of many older buildings, often the prerequisite for low-quality or uninspired new office and residential developments, is considered by them to be due to a combination of developers uninterested in long-term outcomes and Council planning direction being too weak.

In an attempt to reverse the decline of aesthetics in the CBD, previous Auckland City Councils and the current unitary Auckland Council have instigated several urban regeneration schemes. These include the recent redevelopment of Aotea Square in 2010 and the upgrade of Saint Patrick's Square in 2009.
The area east of the Britomart Transport Centre is currently undergoing major changes, with the development of new commercial buildings, development of public spaces and restoration of several heritage buildings. Another major regeneration scheme currently underway is the redevelopment of Wynyard Quarter, which involves replacing industrial facilities covering a large portion of the CBD waterfront with residential or commercial buildings and public spaces.

The Auckland CBD is one of the few places in New Zealand that has skyscraper-sized buildings, such as the Vero Centre, Commercial Bay (skyscraper), ANZ Centre or the Metropolis, with the Sky Tower rising above them.

Population

Residential high-density buildings constructed within the last decade have helped to increase the population living in the CBD to around 54,620 (2018 estimate) from an earlier 21,390 (2006 estimate), all being growth from only 1,400 in 1991. Much of this growth has been driven by immigration to New Zealand, particularly from Asia, and the CBD is the area in New Zealand with the highest percentage share (32%) of the Asian ethnic group in New Zealand. Also striking is the high number of students (both tertiary education and overseas students studying English in one of the many institutes), making up 27% of all residents (2001 Census) and contributing to the relative youth of the city residents.

With increasing population, available services have also changed – from only about one superette in the early 2000s, this has ballooned to one supermarket and 38 superettes by 2011. In early 2012, two major supermarket chains opened a branch in the city centre, with Countdown opening on Victoria Street in January and New World opening a branch on Queen Street in early March. However, the population remains highly focused on ethnically diverse, mostly young and childless residents.

According to an in-depth study of security perception in the Auckland CBD undertaken in 2005, most visitors and locals feel safe visiting and living in the CBD. Police and the Council have in part ascribed these positive feelings to over a dozen safety initiatives undertaken by authorities (from alcohol bans in parts of the CBD to CCTV surveillance and street lighting measures). However, in spite of the general perception of the CBD being safe, there was a feeling that crime had risen somewhat in the last five years (whereas in fact numbers had declined). This was considered to be mostly due to a media-driven public image.

Economy

With 8,500 businesses, the CBD accounts for 18% of all businesses in Auckland City, with the largest being Ports of Auckland, and the largest employment sectors being financial services, business and ICT services. The CBD is also the largest employment centre in New Zealand, with around 65,000 jobs, representing 13% of the regional workforce, and 25% of the Auckland City workforce. Around 73,000 people enter the CBD every morning between 7 am and 9 am, 60% of these by car, while the total 'turnover' is around 270,000 people per day. In 2003 many large corporations were housed in the Auckland CBD. During the same year, an Auckland City report stated that the Auckland CBD, compared to several central business districts in Australia, had "a broader and more dominant role in its regional economy" compared to the economies of the Australian central business districts.

The CBD remains attractive to shops, partially due to the very high pedestrian numbers on the main shopping streets like Queen Street, where footfalls are estimated to be up to 10 times as high as on Broadway in Newmarket, seen as Queen Street's closest rival.

Auckland CBD has a higher share of employment in large firms than other areas in Auckland. Over half of the large firms in Auckland CBD are in office-based sectors (such as property and business services and finance and insurance) and are in the Downtown and Waterfront areas of the CBD. In 2004 Auckland CBD had 72,540 employees and 9125 businesses. 2006 Auckland CBD had 78,444 employees and 9,461 businesses.

Air New Zealand was formerly headquartered in Auckland CBD. In 2006, from late September to early October, the airline moved employees out of the four buildings it occupied in Auckland CBD and relocated them to the new headquarters in the Wynyard Quarter. In September 2003 Air New Zealand was the only one of the very largest corporations in New Zealand to have its headquarters within the Auckland CBD.

Retail

The CBD's main shopping mall, Commercial Bay, opened in 2020. It features 18,000 m2 of lettable real estate space, made up of 120 shops including H&M.

The Atrium on Elliott has 736 carparks and 23 stores, including The Warehouse, Rebel Sport and the Elliott Stables Foodcourt.

The Victoria Park Market was established as a shopping centre in an unused heritage building in 1983. It was extensively renovated between 2008 and 2013. The centre currently features 74 stores, and 194 carparks.

Museums and galleries

Auckland Art Gallery Toi o Tāmaki has been operating in Auckland CBD in 1888.

Since then, several other galleries have also opened in the CBD. Artspace Aotearoa opened in 1987. Gus Fisher Gallery opened in 2001. St Paul St Gallery opened in 2004.

The Dalmatian Archives and Museum, opened in 1989, features the history of Croatian New Zealanders.

The New Zealand Maritime Museum, opened in 1993, features the maritime history of the Waitematā Harbour.

Education
There are significant educational institutions located in the Auckland CBD, notably the University of Auckland and the Auckland University of Technology. The CBD also has many of the English language schools for non-native English speakers which form a significant part of Auckland's education business.

The Ministry of Education operates state-operated schools throughout the area. Private secondary schools within the CBD include ACG New Zealand International College, ACG Senior College, and Auckland International College.

Transport

The CBD, with its substantial employment, and increasing number of residents, contains the main public transport hubs of the city. These services are concentrated around the Britomart Transport Centre (rail and buses) and the nearby Auckland Ferry Terminal, both near the Auckland waterfront. Many bus services travel the length of the CBD along the main streets, in particular via the bus lanes on Albert Street and the Central Connector bus priority route. In 2010, around 33,000 people entered the CBD via public transport every day.

Historically, much of the transport to and around the CBD post-1950s was by private vehicles, partly because the CBD provides numerous parking buildings and parking spaces associated with office buildings, and is almost totally surrounded (and easily accessible) by motorways.

Auckland Council has begun the construction phase of the City Rail Link. Once completed, it will connect the Britomart transport hub more directly to the Western Line in the vicinity of Mount Eden Train Station by way of a tunnel running under the CBD. Two new stations will be constructed, one named Aotea in Aotea Square and one named Karangahape on Karangahape Road, and the existing stations at each end of the link, Britomart and Mount Eden, will receive substantial upgrades.

The main street of the CBD is Queen Street, which was upgraded between 2006 and 2008 to modernise it and make it more pedestrian friendly. 
In 2009, the former Auckland City Council proposed the redevelopment of several CBD streets into shared spaces, with the goal of improving pedestrian and cyclist amenity by slowing down vehicle traffic while retaining the possibility for car access – compared to a pedestrian mall which allows no motor vehicles. Auckland Council is continuing this project. Darby Street, Lorne Street, Fort Street, Jean Batten Place, and Fort Lane have been converted into shared spaces since 2011. The portion of Federal Street between Wellesley Street West and Victoria Street West has also been made shared space.

See also
Auckland isthmus
Auckland City
Auckland waterfront
Karangahape Road, a street which forms the southern boundary of the CBD.
Queen Street, the main north–south street in the CBD.

Illustrations

References

External links
CBD Community E-News
Photographs of Auckland CDB held in Auckland Libraries' heritage collections

 
Suburbs of Auckland
Central business districts in New Zealand
Economy of Auckland
Populated places around the Waitematā Harbour
Waitematā Local Board Area